

Gammarth is a town on the Mediterranean Sea in the Tunis Governorate of Tunisia, located some 15 to 20 kilometres north of Tunis, adjacent to La Marsa. It is an upmarket seaside resort, known for its expensive hotels and shops. Gammarth began as a small fishing village but following independence from France it blossomed into a resort from the 1950s. Tourism now provides the backbone to the local economy. Gammarth has many five-star hotels and restaurants and also contains many lavish white villas and coves in the vicinity. Notable villas include Abou Nawas Gammarth and Les Dunes.

Excavations at Gammarth Hill have revealed some catacombs and Talmudic inscriptions. These ancient burial chambers are believed to date to Roman times in the 2nd century when nearby Carthage was a thriving Roman city.

Gammarth also contains a notable cinema complex.

Gallery

See also
List of cities in Tunisia

References

Populated places in Tunis Governorate
Seaside resorts in Tunisia
Populated coastal places in Tunisia